Arve Tellefsen (born 14 December 1936) is a Norwegian violinist who has worked with conductors such as Mariss Jansons, Arvid Jansons, Herbert Blomstedt, Gary Bertini, Evgeny Svetlanov, Bryden Thomson, Neeme Järvi, Esa-Pekka Salonen, Paavo Berglund, Vladimir Ashkenazy, Walter Weller and Zubin Mehta. In the UK, he has appeared with the Royal Philharmonic, the London Philharmonic, The Hallé, BBC Scottish Symphony Orchestra, BBC Welsh Orchestra, the Liverpool Philharmonic and the Royal Scottish National Orchestra.

Career 

When he was 6 years old, Tellefsen began playing the violin in 'Trondheims musikkskole' (the music school in Trondheim). In 1955, he began his studies at The Royal Danish Academy of Music in Copenhagen. In 1959, he had his debut in Universitetets Aula, Oslo.

Tellefsen has won the Harriet Cohen International Music Award.

Tellefsen founded the Oslo Chamber Music Festival, which takes place annually and attracts the cream of international artists, including Anne Sofie von Otter, Randi Stene, Solveig Kringlebotn, Elizabeth Norberg-Schulz, Barbara Hendricks, Liv Ullmann, Jan Garbarek, Leif Ove Andsnes, Truls Mørk, Yuri Bashmet, Mischa Maisky, Gidon Kremer, Angela Hewitt, Hagen Quartet, Hilliard Ensemble, Jordi Savall, Rolf Lislevand and Maria João Pires. He has also recently recorded Edvard Grieg: Complete Violin Sonatas with pianist Håvard Gimse at Grieg's home, Troldhaugen. His latest recording is music by the famous Norwegian violinist and composer Ole Bull (1810-1880)

1984 aircraft emergency 
In February 1984 he participated in an emergency evacuation on an SAS flight that ended up in the water off of JFK airport.
Although instructed to leave their possessions, he refused to abandon his priceless Guarneri violin as they evacuated onto an inflatable raft.
The evacuees had to paddle away from the airliner with their bare hands, and due to the lack of oars there arose several suggestions (though mostly in jest) to use the precious instrument as a replacement thereof.

Prizes and Honours 

1956: Knight of Polyhymnia, the order of the Symphony Orchestra at Studentersamfundet i Trondhjem.
1956: «Princess Astrid Musical Award»
1962: Harriet Cohen International Music Award, London
1968/1969: Musikk-kritikerprisen
1973: «Griegprisen»
1975: Festspill-prisen Festspillene i Bergen
1977: «Sør-Trøndelag county Culture Award»
1977: Spellemannprisen in Open class, for the Sindings fiolinkonsert/du milde Mozart
1978: «This years 'Peer Gynt'»
1980: Spellemannprisen in the class Classical music / Contemporary music for Serenade
1983: Gammlengprisen 1983 in the class Classical music
1986: Spellemannprisen in the class Classical music / Contemporary music for the Grieg sonater for fiolin/klaver og cello/klaver together with Eva Knardahl (klaver), Aage Kvalbein (cello) og Jens Harald Bratlie (klaver)
1988: Spellemannprisen in Open class, for the album Pan
1988: Appointed member of the Royal Swedish Academy of Music
1994: Oslo City Culture Award
1994: Appointed «Commander of St. Olavs Orden»
1996: Norsk kulturråds ærespris
1996: Doctor Art Honoris Causa NTNU (Honorary Doctorate by the Norges Teknisk-Naturvitenskapelige Universitet in Trondheim)
1997: Honorary Citizen of Trondheim i 1997, a statue of Tellefsen was raised
2004: «Fartein Valen Award»
2004: «Ole Bull Award»
2005: Appointed «Commander with Star of St. Olavs Orden»
2007: «Anders Jahres Culture Award»
2009: Receiving an honorary degree at the Norwegian Academy of Music.

Discography (in selection)

Solo albums 
1988: Pan (Norsk Plateproduksjon)
1992: Intermezzo (Grappa Music)
1995: Arco (Grappa Music)

As soloist 
1964: Air Norvegen (Philips Records), with Robert Levin
1967: Fartein Valen: Violin Concerto op. 37, with Bergen Philharmonic Orchestra, conductor: Karsten Andersen
1973: Schostakowitsch: Violinkonzert Op. 77 (BASF), with the Schwedisches Radio-Sinfonie-Orchester, conductor: Gary Bertini
1974: Johan Svendsen: Fiolinkonsert, Op. 6 / Cellokonsert, Op. 7 (Norsk Kulturråds Klassikerserie), with Hege Waldeland (cello), Filharmonisk Selskaps Orkester, Musikselskabet «Harmonien»'s Orkester, conductor: Karsten Andersen
1977: Christian Sinding, Konsert For Fiolin Og Orkester Nr. 1, Op. 45 / Suite For Fiolin Og Orkester Op. 10 / Legende For Fiolin Og Orkester Op. 46 (Norsk Kulturråds Klassikerserie), with Filharmonisk Selskaps Orkester, conductors: Okko Kamu & Kjell Ingebretsen
1979: Johan Daniel Berlin: Fiolinkonsert - 2 Symfonier - 4 Menuetter (Norsk Kulturråds Klassikerserie), with Kjell Jønnum (trumpet) Gayle Mosand (harpsichord) & musicians from «Trondheim Kammerorkester», conductor: Arve Tellefsen
1980: Ole Bull: En Jubileumskonsert Med Kjente Og Ukjente Komposisjoner Inkl. «Sæterjentens Søndag» (Norsk Kulturråds Klassikerserie), with Musikkselskabet «Harmonien»'s Orkester, conductor: Karsten Andersen
1986: Edvard Grieg: Fiolinsonate Nr. 1 I F-Dur, Opus 8 / Fiolinsonate Nr. 2 I G-Dur, Opus 13 (Norsk Kulturråds Klassikerserie), with Eva Knardahl (klaver)
1986: Edvard Grieg: Fiolinsonate Nr. 3 I C-Moll, Opus 45 / Cellosonate I A-Moll, Opus 36 (Norsk Kulturråds Klassikerserie), with Eva Knardahl (Grand Piano), Aage Kvalbein (cello) & Jens Harald Bratlie (Grand Piano)
1989: Edvard Grieg: Violin Sonatas (Norsk Kulturråds Klassikerserie), with Eva Knardahl (piano)
1991: Schostakowitsch: Chamber Works (BIS)
1993: Schostakowitsch: Violin Concerto no. 1 op. 99 / Bach: Violin Concerto in E major (Grappa Music), with the Royal Philharmonic Orchestra, conductor: Paavo Berglund
1994: Carl Nielsen: Fiolinkonsert op. 33 (Virgin Classics), with the Royal Philharmonic Orchestra, conductor: Sir Yehudi Menuhin
1994: Ludwig van Beethoven: Fiolinkonsert op. 61, Max Bruch: Fiolinkonsert op. 26 (Grappa Music), med London Philharmonic Orchestra, conductor: Vernon Handley
1995: Jean Sibelius: Violin Concerto in D minor, Op. 47 (Simax Classics), with the Royal Philharmonic Orchestra, conductor: Paavo Berglund
1997: Stille Natt (Sony Classical), with Nidarosdomens Guttekor, conductor: Bjørn Moe
1997: Arne Nordheim: Violin Concerto (Sony Classical), Oslo Filharmoniske Orkester, conductor: Christian Eggen
1999: Nielsen: Violin Concerto; Symphony No 4 (Simax Classics), with Royal Philharmonic Orchestra, conductor: Sir Yehudi Menuhin
1999: Edvard Grieg: Samlede Fiolinsonater (Sony Classical), with Håvard Gimse (klaver)
2006: Aria (Simax Classics), with Nidarosdomens Guttekor
2008: Nielsen: Symphony No. 5 - Concertos - Wind Quintet, with the Danish Radio Symphony Orchestra, conductor: Rafael Kubelík
2010: Ole Bull: Arve Tellefsen Plays Ole Bull (Simax Classics), with the Trondheim Symphony Orchestra, conductor: Eivind Aadland

Collaborative works 
1977: Du Milde Mosart! (NorDisc), with Knutsen & Ludvigsen and «Bakklandet Bassangforening»

Compilations 
1992: Musikken Inni Oss / Nattønsker (Sonet Records), with Sigmund Groven
2001: Nielsen / Vaughan Williams: Symphonies & Concertos (Virgin Classics), with Markham, Broadway & the Royal Philharmonic Orchestra, conductor: Yehudi Menuhin

References

External links 

1936 births
Living people
Musicians from Trondheim
Royal Danish Academy of Music alumni
Norwegian classical violinists
Male classical violinists
Spellemannprisen winners
Grappa Music artists
21st-century classical violinists
21st-century Norwegian male musicians